Staraya Nikola is a rural locality (a pogost) in Vakhromeyevskoye Rural Settlement, Kameshkovsky District, Vladimir Oblast, Russia. The population was 11 as of 2010.

Geography 
The village is located 2 km north from Posyolok imeni Gorkogo, 17 km north from Kameshkovo.

References 

Rural localities in Kameshkovsky District